Cooper Mountain is a mountain in Washington County, Oregon, United States. The mountain and surrounding area are named for Ohio immigrant Perry Cooper who settled on the mountain.

Namesakes 
 Cooper Mountain Nature Park
 Cooper Mountain Vineyards
 Cooper Mountain Elementary School outside Beaverton  
 Cooper Mountain Presbyterian Church in Aloha
 Cooper Mountain Evangelical Cemetery
 Cooper Mountain Cemetery

References

External links 
 

Mountains of Oregon
Landforms of Washington County, Oregon